Katarína Cibulková (born 14 January 1962 in Vráble) is a Slovak politician, former member of the National Council in the Slovak Democratic and Christian Union – Democratic Party caucus.

Cibulková graduated in law from the Comenius University in 1984. She worked as in house counsel and from 1996 an attorney. Between 2006 and 2012 she served as an MP of the National Council.

In 1998-2010 she served as a town councilor in Piešťany. In 2009-2013 she served as a member of the Trnava region assembly.

Together with her husband Milan she has one daughter - the tennis player Dominika Cibulková. In 2010 she was penalized by the Speaker of the National Council for missing votes due to attending her daughter's games.

References 

Slovak Democratic and Christian Union – Democratic Party politicians
1962 births
Living people
People from Nitra District
Members of the National Council (Slovakia) 2006-2010
Members of the National Council (Slovakia) 2010-2012
21st-century Slovak women politicians
Comenius University alumni
Female members of the National Council (Slovakia)
20th-century Slovak women politicians
20th-century Slovak politicians